1995 JEF United Ichihara season

Review and events

League results summary

League results by round

Competitions

Domestic results

J.League

Emperor's Cup

Player statistics

 † player(s) joined the team after the opening of this season.

Transfers

In:

Out:

Transfers during the season

In
 Tarō Gotō (from Nagoya Grampus Eight)

Out

Awards
none

References

Other pages
 J. League official site
 JEF United Ichihara Chiba official web site

JEF United Ichihara
JEF United Chiba seasons